Soad Louis Lakah (November 23, 1952 - April 26, 2020) Was a Colombian writer and poet, being the first woman in Sinú who, in the seventies of the 20th century, dared to build a narrative and investigative work on the cultural ancestors of Sinú and its Syrian-Lebanese origins, in addition to being a cultural manager who preserved those values.

Soad broke into the regional and national literary scene with her book 'Reasons of weight', some stories focused on popular stories from Ciénaga de Oro, her homeland, under the spell of Sinú.

Her first challenge as a woman was daring to write in a department that had no tradition of women writers, and she blazed that trail in the face of harassment, stigma, and social prejudice.

References

External links 
 

1952 births
2020 deaths
20th-century Colombian poets
20th-century Colombian writers
Colombian women writers
Colombian women poets
People from Córdoba Department